Akha (also Romanized as Ākhā; also known as Ākhāzīr) is a village in Bala Larijan Rural District, Larijan District, Amol County, Mazandaran Province, Iran. At the 2006 census, its population was 155, in 43 families.

References 

Populated places in Amol County